is a Japanese female announcer and newscaster for NHK.

Early years

Born and raised in Okayama, Japan, Akaki graduated from Keio University. During college, she won the Runner Up title in the Yukata Beauty Contest, Tokyo's local beauty pageant.

Career

After graduating from Keio University in 2013, Akaki was hired by NHK and started her career at NHK Tokushima Branch, where she worked until March 2015. In April 2015, she was relocated to NHK Osaka Branch, where she hosted News Hot Kansai.

In March 2017, Akaki was moved to Tokyo Announcement Room and appointed as a biweekly newscaster of NHK's morning news show NHK News Ohayō Nippon as well as Yurie Omi. At the same time, she co-hosts an information program Naming Variety Nipponjin no Onamae! (currently Nipponjin no Onamae) with Ichiro Furutachi.

On February 21, 2018, NHK has announced that Akaki is leaving NHK News Ohayō Nippon and being an anchor for Shinsedai ga Toku! Nippon no Dilemma from April 2018.

On February 9, 2022, NHK announced that Akaki was supposed to be the host of the newly-founded weekend night news show Saturday Watch 9 in April.

Personal life

Akaki has been a good harpist since junior high school. She joined Okayama Junior Orchestra and sometimes played in public.

See also
 Ichiro Furutachi

References

External links
 Nonoka Akaki, Tokyo Announcement Room

1990 births
Living people
Keio University alumni
Japanese announcers
Japanese television personalities
Japanese television presenters
Japanese women television presenters
People from Okayama Prefecture